The Bartell House in Junction City, Kansas, is a hotel built in 1879. It is located at 6th and Washington Streets. It was listed on the National Register of Historic Places in 1980. It has also been known as Lamer Hotel.

It is a three-story brick "Commercial Palace" style hotel with stone trim. Extensions added later brought the building to a U-shape, within a  plan.

References

Houses on the National Register of Historic Places in Kansas
Italianate architecture in Kansas
Houses completed in 1879
National Register of Historic Places in Geary County, Kansas
Hotels in Kansas